Azwihangwisi Faith Muthambi is the former Minister of Public Service and Administration and former Minister of Communications of South Africa.

She resigned from the National Assembly of South Africa on 28 November 2022.

Career 

Muthambi held a number of positions prior to her appointment to President Jacob Zuma's cabinet in 2014:

 Member and activist of SANSCO (1989-1990);
 Tshimbupfe ANC Youth League branch Secretary (1991-1992);
 Executive Committee member of Tshimbupfe ANC branch (1992-1993);
 Deputy Secretary of the Vuwani Zone (1993-1999);
 Regional Executive Committee member of the Vhembe ANC Youth League (2003-2005);
 Provincial Treasurer of the ANC Youth League in Limpopo (2005-2008);
 Member of the Provincial Executive Committee of the ANC Women's League branch in Limpopo (2008-to-date);
 Regional Executive Member of the ANC Vhembe region (2006-to-date);
 Member of the National Assembly and the Pan African Parliament (April 2009 – Present); and
 ANC Whip on the Communication Portfolio Committee.

She was one of the seven ANC MPs who were nominated for the ad hoc committee to consider President Jacob Zuma‘s submissions on the public protector’s report on his Nkandla homestead.

Muthambi holds a B Proc from the University of Venda (1993-1996), and various other certifications and qualifications from UPTA, Wits Business School and UNIVEN.

An ad hoc Parliamentary committee found Muthambi "incompetent" and guilty of misleading parliament, which is a criminal offence. She also failed to attend a meeting where she was supposed to explain the R300,000 she spent on transport costs for friends and family to watch her deliver a speech. She has also failed to attend a meeting in order to account for her personal staff of 27 (many of whom are the children of friends of hers), when the ministerial handbook limits this figure to 10.

As a result of the Public Protector’s findings of abuses of power, fraud and maladministration against Hlaudi Motsoeneng, the Western Cape High Court concluded that Muthambi had acted irrationally and unlawfully by appointing Motsoeneng as Chief Operating Officer of the SABC.

Treason and corruption charges 2017

In 2017 Organisation Undoing Tax Abuse (OUTA) laid charges of treason and corruption against Muthambi over claims that the then Minister of Communications deliberately shared three confidential Cabinet memoranda about executive policy and the scope of her ministerial powers through emails with Tony Gupta, Duduzane Zuma and Sahara’s CEO Ashu Chawla in July 2014. This was shortly after former president Jacob Zuma appointed her communications minister.

Criminal charges 2019

Following the release of the report of the commission of inquiry into editorial interference at the SABC in 2016, the Democratic Alliance opened a criminal case against Muthambi for misleading parliament, in contravention of the Powers, Privileges and Immunities of Parliament and Provincial Legislatures Act, which establishes the SABC as an independent institution. The commission of inquiry found that Muthambi (along with two others named in the final report) abused her power to get coverage of specific stories concerning her private interests, and interfered on several occasions in editorial decisions at the state broadcaster during her time as Communications Minister.

References

External links
 Marian Shinn:Fear for our Internet freedoms
 ANC Page: Faith Muthambi
 
 ITWeb's News Archive on Faith Muthambi

Year of birth missing (living people)
Living people
African National Congress politicians
Communications ministers of South Africa
Women government ministers of South Africa
Members of the National Assembly of South Africa
Controversies in South Africa
Corruption in South Africa